Kickstarter EP is a promotional EP by the American group The Narrative featured in Kickstarter project for the band in March–April Spring Tour 2011 with Eisley.
Kickstarter is a project that helped to fund the band's tour expenses, started in 2009.

The band have posted on their Twitter account about the process of recording those songs for the EP "Working on a kickstarter that will hopefully launch sometime next week"  and on 24 March 2011 they released the EP titled Kickstarted, name of the platform used for funding the Spring Tour with Eisley. The sale of the EP had a special package with 3/4 signed items for the band.

The band had set $5,000 for this project initially. The campaign was successfully funded with an amount of $8,500. This promotional EP was released with two brand new songs called "Hallelujah" and "Make It Right" recorded especially for this EP and featured in the digital release for the band EP in 2012, B-Sides and Seasides, the cover of Radiohead, "Karma Police", and the demo version of the song "End All" of 2007.

Track listing

Personnel

The Narrative 
 Suzie Zeldin - Vocals, keys
 Jesse Gabriel - Vocals, guitar

Additional personnel 
 Bryan Russell - Producer
 Joshua Krohn - Album Cover

Critical response 
The site Alter The Press! wrote a review for the EP "When a record plays on personal weaknesses by playing dueling backing vocals like that it’s hard not to sing its praises, but they are praises that are truly deserved, wielding might that lesser elements would have found it hard to conceive."

Notes 

2011 EPs
The Narrative EPs
Kickstarter-funded albums
Promotional albums